Chapter 8 may refer to:

 Chapter 8 (band), a Detroit soul group
 Chapter 8 (Chapter 8 album), 1979
 Chapter 8 (g.o.d album), 2014
 Chapter 8 (American Horror Story), an episode of the anthology television series American Horror Story
 "Chapter 8: Redemption", an episode of the first season of The Mandalorian
 Chapter 8 (cyber security), a Dutch cyber security company